Senator Denning may refer to:

Jim Denning (born 1956), Kansas State Senate
William Denning (1740–1819), New York State Senate